Metallica is an American heavy metal band.

Metallica may also refer to:
 Metallica (album) or The Black Album, a 1991 album by Metallica
 Guitar Hero: Metallica

as well as:
 Metallica (beetle), a beetle genus
 Metallica Resources, a Canadian mineral exploration and development company
 De re metallica, a 1556 catalog of the mining and refining of metals, by Georgius Agricola
 Metallica, the stand of Risotto Nero, a antagonist in the manga series Jojo’s Bizarre Adventure story arc Golden Wind

See also
 Metalica, a prototype Pentax camera
 Metallic (disambiguation)
 Metallicus (disambiguation)